The 2009 Harvard Crimson football team was an American football team that represented Harvard University in the 2009 NCAA Division I FCS football season. The Crimson finished second in the Ivy League. Harvard averaged 10,701 fans per game.

Harvard played its home games at Harvard Stadium in the Allston neighborhood of Boston, Massachusetts.

Schedule

References

Harvard
Harvard Crimson football seasons
Harvard Crimson football
Harvard Crimson football